The SO Legal Stadium at Priory Lane is an association football stadium located in Langney, an eastern suburb of Eastbourne, East Sussex, England. It is the home of Eastbourne Borough who play in the National League South. Eastbourne Borough have used this stadium since moving from the playing fields at Princes Park in 1983.

History
Building commenced in 1983 when the club, which had just joined the Sussex County Football League, leased a playing field and built a garage to store equipment in. The first competitive match played at Priory Lane was against East Preston on 15 September 1984, a match which the Sports won 1–0. At this point in time, the team played on the pitch in front of the modern stadium site. They have played on the current pitch since 1988.

Over the years the ground has seen a lot of development. Involving piping a tunnel and installing their own pumping station for drainage. The Peter Fountain stand was first to be built in 1989, named after the man who supplied the labour. This was later extended in the early 1990s as Langney Sports were working their way up in the Sussex County League.

There was also a hump where spectators had excellent views of the pitch before the Mick Green stand was built in 1995 ready for the 1995–96 season and is in memory of the club captain who was killed in a building accident in 1994. The Mick Green stand holds the players dressing rooms and a tea bar on the ground level and hospitality suites upstairs.

Construction of the Main stand began in the 1999–00 season and following funding from the Football Foundation in March 2001 and promotion to the National Conference in 2008 was expanded to its current capacity.

Part of the stadium complex includes the Langney Sports Club, which is open to non-members on selected match days, an indoor bowls centre, archery and tennis courts.

In 2007, a rent dispute with the local council created concern that Eastbourne Borough would lose its stadium after the former attempted to increase the rent from £3,000 to £17,000. The supporters club stepped in and collected over 1,000 signatures in a petition.
In June 2009, the FA decided that Priory Lane stadium is a Grade A Stadium but advised that the capacity to be reduced to 4,134. The criteria for a Grade A stadium is to have a capacity of 4,000 with at least 500 seats although to be expanded to 5,000 spectators with 1,000 seats by the end of their first season in League Two.

The record attendance is 3,770 against Oxford United in the FA Challenge Cup 1st Round on 5 October 2005.

The first live televised game was on 12 October 2008 in a league game against Stevenage Borough.

In March 2016, plans were finalised to switch to a 3G Artificial Turf in time for the 2016–17 season.

Borough reached a ground-share agreement with neighbours Langney Wanderers in April 2017. Wanderers will play their home matches at Priory Lane from the 2017–18 season.

In August 2022, Borough reached an agreement with SO Legal Ltd to rename the stadium The SO Legal Stadium at Priory Lane. The deal will initially run until the end of the 2023/24 season. SO Legal are a law firm from Eastbourne that have offices in Eastbourne, Brighton, Hastings, Uckfield, London, and Ulverston.

Stands
 Main Stand has a seating area for 600 spectators, there is a Directors' Suite and Main Sponsor's Executive Suite. Also an Announcer's Box and Press area is also situated in this stand. There is also a family area and disabled access to this stand.
 The Mick Green Stand houses the dressing rooms, a tea bar (with seating inside), and provides covered terracing at the Priory Road end of the ground. The upper floor has four Executive Suites, in addition to the exclusive 'Legends Lounge', with windows fronting on to the pitch.
 Peter Fountain Stand is a covered terrace and houses a tea bar. This is where the home fans chant from.
 River End Stand is a covered terrace but has no amenities. This is where away fans are designated on segregation match days.

There is a car park for 400 vehicles, mainly behind the River End stand with a small car park in front of the clubhouse.

Segregation
Borough never segregated League games before their promotion to the Conference. However, in the 2008/09 season after a home game against Mansfield Town, some games with bigger clubs have been segregated, with the away fans using the River End stand.

Other uses
In 2006 the stadium was chosen by The Football Association to stage all three of England's fixtures in the Non League Home Nations Tournament. The final of the Sussex Senior Challenge Cup was staged here between 2000 and 2010.

Future developments
Eastbourne Borough released plans to expand Priory Lane in December 2011. The main focus of the development will be the Peter Fountain (North) Stand, which will include installing a number of Executive Boxes, adding new Changing Rooms and a players tunnel. The River End (East) Stand is due to have 16 tiers of terracing to improve the atmosphere and the Main (South) Stand is planned to be extended to provide additional seating with youth team changing rooms built along the back of the stand facing a new pitch for the youth team.

Transport
The ground is located over a mile away from Pevensey & Westham railway station, which lies on the East Coastway Line between Hastings and Eastbourne. Eastbourne railway station is around six miles away with good transport links. Both are served by Southern Railway.
There are approximately 400 parking spaces at the stadium and the residential streets near the stadium have limited parking. There is a bus service served from Eastbourne town centre.

Attendances

The progression of Eastbourne's attendance record at Priory Lane is as follows:

Updated 10 May 2016

The five highest attendances for Eastbourne at Priory Lane are:

Updated 10 May 2016

References

External links

Official Website page about Stadium
Football Ground Guide about Stadium

Eastbourne Borough F.C.
Sport in Eastbourne
Sports venues in East Sussex
Buildings and structures in Eastbourne
Football venues in England
Sports venues completed in 1988